Calañas is a town and municipality located in the province of Huelva, Spain. According to the 2005 census, the city has a population of 4,478 inhabitants.

Demographics

References

External links
Calañas - Sistema de Información Multiterritorial de Andalucía

Municipalities in the Province of Huelva